Albert Street may refer to:
Albert Street, Brisbane, Queensland, Australia
Albert Street, Camden, London, England
Albert Street, East Melbourne, Victoria, Australia
Albert Street (Ottawa), Ontario, Canada
Albert Street (Regina, Saskatchewan), Canada
Albert Street, Riga, Latvia
Albert Street (Singapore), Singapore